Mario Barco Vilar (born 23 December 1992) is a Spanish footballer who plays as a forward.

Club career
Born in Estella-Lizarra, Navarre, Barco finished his formation with CD Calahorra, after representing Peña Sport FC and Athletic Bilbao. He made his senior debuts with the former in the 2011–12 campaign, scoring 20 goals in Tercera División.

In August 2012 Barco signed for UD Logroñés in Segunda División B, after impressing in a trial basis. On 10 July of the following year he returned to the Lions, being assigned to the reserves also in the third level.

On 28 January 2015 Barco rescinded his contract, and moved to fellow league team Barakaldo CF hours later. On 5 July he signed a three-year deal with CD Lugo in Segunda División, but was loaned to UD Somozas on 10 August.

On 8 August 2016 Barco joined Pontevedra CF in the third tier, also in a temporary deal. He scored 12 goals for the club during the campaign, but missed the play-offs due to injury.

Barco made his professional debut on 12 October 2017, coming on as a substitute for Francisco Fydriszewski and scoring the last in a 2–0 home win against Córdoba CF. The following 25 June, he signed a three-year contract with Cádiz CF also in the second division.

On 23 July 2019, after being rarely used, Barco terminated his contract with the Andalusians, and joined fellow second division side CD Mirandés on a two-year deal the following day. After two years used mainly as a substitute, he moved to Primera División RFEF side CD Castellón on 21 July 2021.

References

External links
 

1992 births
Living people
Spanish footballers
Footballers from Navarre
Association football forwards
Segunda División players
Primera Federación players
Segunda División B players
Tercera División players
UD Logroñés players
Bilbao Athletic footballers
Barakaldo CF footballers
CD Lugo players
Pontevedra CF footballers
Cádiz CF players
CD Mirandés footballers
CD Castellón footballers